The 2017–18 season is Club Atlético River Plate's 7th consecutive season in the top-flight of Argentine football. The season covers the period from 1 July 2017 to 30 June 2018.

Season events
On June 26, Germán Lux signed a 3-year contract after leaving Deportivo La Coruña. This was the return of the goalkeeper to the team where he started his career in 2001. He had left in 2007.

On June 30, the new signed players Germán Lux, Javier Pinola, Enzo Perez and Ignacio Scocco were officially presented in a press conference at the club's stadium.

On September 28, River Plate presented the new home kit for the 2017–18 season.

On October 11, River Plate released the new alternative kit, featuring red as main color.

On December 10, River won the 2016–17 Copa Argentina after defeating Atlético Tucumán in the final game played in Mendoza. This was the second title in a row for River Plate at this competition.

On January 9, Lucas Pratto signed a four and a half year contract with River Plate.

On January 11, Franco Armani signed a three-year contract with River Plate.

On January 24, Juan Quintero arrived at River Plate on a one-year loan from FC Porto.

On January 29, Bruno Zuculini signed a four and a half year contract with River Plate.

On January 31, Leonardo Ponzio extended his contract with River Plate until June 2019.

On February 14, River Plate released the new third kit, featuring vertical stripes of red black and white.

On March 6, the matches of the final stage of 2017–18 Copa Argentina were drawn. River Plate was paired with Central Norte from Salta.

On March 14, River Plate  won the 2017 Supercopa Argentina after defeating Boca Juniors in Mendoza.

On March 16, it was announced a friendly match between River Plate and Universidad de Chile to be played in Santiago, on 24 March.

Squad Summer

Squad Winter

Transfers

In Summer

Out Summer

In Winter

Out Winter

Loan Out

Friendlies

Winter pre-season

Mid-season

Summer pre-season

Mid-season

Primera División

League table

Results by matchday

2016–17 Copa Argentina

2017 Copa Libertadores

Round of 16

Quarter-finals

Semi-finals

2018 Copa Libertadores

Group stage

2017 Supercopa Argentina

2017–18 Copa Argentina

References

Club Atlético River Plate seasons
River Plate